Taradale is a suburb of the City of Napier, in the Hawke's Bay Region of the North Island of New Zealand. It is a predominantly middle-upper class residential suburb, located 10 kilometres southwest of the centre of Napier. The Taradale ward, which includes Greenmeadows, Meeanee, and Poraiti, had a population of 22,809 in the 2018 New Zealand census.

For hundreds of years, hills overlooking what is now Taradale were the site of villages occupied by Māori people, latterly of the Ngāti Kahungunu tribe. Europeans started settling at Taradale in the 1850s, and it was officially recognised as a town in 1886. It was a town district from 1886 to 1953, and a borough from 1953 to 1968, when it merged with Napier City. The Taradale area is home to some of New Zealand's oldest and finest vineyards and wineries, with a wine-making heritage dating back to the 1850s.

History

Early Māori history 
Several hundred years ago there was a large Māori pā (fortified settlement) on the hills at the southern edge of what is now Taradale. Originally a double pā, the top part was called Hikurangi and the bottom Ōtātara. Occupied by a tribe known as Tini-o-Awa or Ngāti Awa, the pā terraces enclosed about 100 hectares and were home to around 3,000 Māori. The pā was on an excellent defensive site beside the Tutaekuri River, which was navigable by canoe from the sea. Food was plentiful, the hillsides were suitable for kūmara growing and much of the area was a large tidal location with fish, eels and shellfish.

The pā was attacked early in the 16th century by the Ngāti Kahungunu tribe under chiefs Taraia and Rakai-hiku-roa. They came from Tūranga, near what is now Gisborne, and defeated the Hikurangi pā. Unable to take Ōtātara at that time, Taraia set up a new pā at Pākōwhai. Some time later he organised another war party and again besieged Ōtātara. Legend has it that Taraia waited until the defenders were short of food. He then left, leaving a small party concealed near a patch of fern. The defenders sent two men out to dig for fern roots. They were ambushed then killed and their places taken by two of Taraia's men. When the defenders saw the men digging they thought them to be from Ōtātara so they opened up the pā and went out to help. Taraia's men attacked and killed many of the local Māori. The pā then collapsed and was abandoned.

Over the years marriages took place between local Māori and Ngāti Kahungunu and peace was restored. Today the Ōtātara pā site has become a memorial to the Māori who were so prevalent in the area many years ago.

Early European history 
Taradale has a rich heritage stemming from its key role as the original gateway to the inland routes (including Taupō, Auckland and Taihape) and to the farms and settlements of its hinterland.

In 1851 Donald McLean purchased, on behalf of the Crown, the Ahuriri Block, which included present-day Taradale and Greenmeadows. By the mid-1850s settlers began flocking to the province. The census held in 1856 showed that in Hawke's Bay there were 1057 males and 458 females. The government purchased the Tutaekuri Block in 1856, which was subdivided, with Ahuriri Block, as the river Meeanee District and released for sale in April 1857.

William Colenso purchased several blocks of land, a large block in Puketapu, Meeanee and 364 near Ōtātara. This block stretched from Guppy Road to the Puketapu hills and was bounded by the Great North Road (now Meeanee/Puketapu Roads) and the Tutaekuri River. Henry Stokes Tiffen bought most of the land north of the road to Puketapu and west of Guppy Road and named it Green Meadows after the native danthonia grass that covered the region. Henry Alley came to the area and leased land from Colenso in 1858, naming the area Taradale.

Naming of Taradale

It was once thought that Alley called the area Taradale after the hill of Tara, County Meath, Ireland, where he was supposed to have been born. However, death records show that Henry Alley was not born in County Meath but in Queen's County, Ireland. He emigrated to South Australia and then Victoria, Australia, where he lived in the Victorian township of Taradale until circa 1855, where he and his sister purchased a number of blocks of land. Henry Alley built what was reputed to be the first house, somewhere in the vicinity of Alley Place and Lowther Place. Taradale High School retains a link with the early days of Taradale, its emblem incorporating the Tara Brooch.

Town board and borough council

In 1886 a petition was sent to the Governor of New Zealand, Sir William Francis Drummond Jervois, asking him to proclaim the district of Taradale as a dependent town district under the provision of the Town Districts Act 1881. The Hawke's Bay County Council confirmed the petition and the Town District of Taradale was proclaimed on 2 December 1886. A town board was formed with John Drummond (Chairman), Robert Davidson, Richard Martin, Richard Neagle and George Bradley. William Waterhouse was the first Town Clerk. Taradale was administered by the town board from 1886 to 1953, and by a borough council from 1953 to 1968.

Military history

Taradale's military history is typical of an early New Zealand town. The Battle of Omarunui, fought nearby on 12 October 1866, saw the settlers and local Māori join to defend against an intrusion by the Hauhau faction during the New Zealand Wars.

District residents volunteered to fight in South Africa against the Boers, and again in World War 1, World War 2 and subsequent engagements that New Zealand has committed to.

Twentieth century
1931 earthquake

Before the 1931 Hawke's Bay earthquake, Taradale and Greenmeadows were separated from distant Napier by a harbour lagoon and tidal mudflats, bridged from 1874 by the corduroy Taradale Road. Other access was by the coastal sandpits road to Awatoto, then to Meeanee village and the Great North Road (Meeanee Road). These barriers forced Taradale's township and pioneer farming settlers to develop staunch independence, setting up their own facilities, businesses and recreational resources. Many of the elements of this historical heritage remain today; as well as the geographical boundaries, Anderson Park and green patches on the edge of Greenmeadows are visual boundaries that separate Taradale and Greenmeadows from the rest of Napier City. As a consequence of the 1931 earthquake, the raised seabed enabled Napier's residential suburbs to spread slowly south towards Taradale and Greenmeadows as swamps were reclaimed. Buildings destroyed by the earthquake were rebuilt in Art Deco style architecture, examples being Taradale Town Hall and Taradale Hotel (now a McDonald's restaurant).

Garden Borough

Taradale in the 1960s was one of the fastest-growing boroughs in New Zealand. Retailers considered it a good place to establish shops with rapidly expanding population. People took pride in their property and Taradale became known as the Garden Borough.

Amalgamation

Amalgamation with Napier had been proposed and disputed for many years, and the merger was passed by referendum in 1968. The final meeting of the Borough Council was held on 26 March 1968 and Taradale became a part of Napier City Council, even though it still retains its strong community spirit. The last Mayor of Taradale was Arthur Miller, a popular and respected member of the community. He is remembered for his public service, especially in his push to establish Taradale Intermediate and Taradale High School. His support for education was recognised in 1971, when a new school in Guppy Road was named Arthur Miller School.

Recent history 
Taradale has continued to expand and develop, with a current growth rate of 6.7%, well above the Hawkes Bay regional growth rate of 3.9% and Napier of 3.2%. As new subdivisions meet the increased demand for middle to high-end residential property, there are several new subdivision developments underway in Mission Heights, Citrus Grove and Kent Terrace with over 1400 residential sections in progress. And recent upgrading of Taradale's Town Centre is bringing it into the 21st century, as $3.5 million in council funds has been committed to undertake a renovation including garden streetscape and enhanced pedestrian linkages to slow traffic and improve customer access. A revised parking plan forms part of the overall strategy as does further integration with public green space and services such as the library.

Governance 
Napier City Council has organised the city into four wards – the Taradale ward comprises Taradale, Greenmeadows, Poraiti, Meeanee and Awatoto, similar to the early Taradale district.

Geography 
Taradale is a predominantly middle-upper class residential township, nestled against the Taradale hills 10-minutes drive from the centre of the tourist destination of Napier City. It has over a third of Napier's population, and one of the highest socioeconomic demographic profiles in Hawke's Bay.

Residential housing spans decades of design styles from villas through art deco. Premium housing is also scattered around the township. Homes in the elevated hill areas to the west of the town centre have views of Hawke's Bay, Cape Kidnappers and the Heretaunga plains. Many of Taradale's residents commute to the Napier or Hastings CBDs and prefer rural or suburban life as opposed to the city life of central Napier.

Gloucester Street, the main street and shopping area, has core retail that is predominately contained within a traditional busy high street. Taradale's village is a vibrant destination with its boutique shopping, café culture and atmosphere. Gloucester Street is within 2 km of the wineries in Church Road and is perfectly situated to benefit from the regular influx of visitors generated by these wineries.

Greenmeadows
Greenmeadows. New Zealand is an area some two kilometres north of the Taradale town centre, and an integral part of the Taradale community. Greenmeadows from the beginning has been seen as an extension of Taradale rather than a separate community, Greenmeadows formally became a part of Taradale Town District in 1941. This gives the Taradale and Greenmeadows area which is also known merely as Taradale, or Greendale for local facilities; a population of roughly 17,000. It has a small shopping village with essential services and Greenmeadows New World supermarket.

Demographics

Taradale had a population of 12,456 at the 2018 New Zealand census, an increase of 624 people (5.3%) since the 2013 census, and an increase of 1,131 people (10.0%) since the 2006 census. There were 4,902 households, comprising 5,751 males and 6,702 females, giving a sex ratio of 0.86 males per female, with 2,193 people (17.6%) aged under 15 years, 1,827 (14.7%) aged 15 to 29, 5,106 (41.0%) aged 30 to 64, and 3,333 (26.8%) aged 65 or older.

Ethnicities were 87.4% European/Pākehā, 12.9% Māori, 1.6% Pacific peoples, 6.4% Asian, and 1.7% other ethnicities. People may identify with more than one ethnicity.

The percentage of people born overseas was 19.1, compared with 27.1% nationally.

Although some people chose not to answer the census's question about religious affiliation, 48.1% had no religion, 40.0% were Christian, 1.2% had Māori religious beliefs, 0.8% were Hindu, 0.3% were Muslim, 0.8% were Buddhist and 1.5% had other religions.

Of those at least 15 years old, 2,010 (19.6%) people had a bachelor's or higher degree, and 2,049 (20.0%) people had no formal qualifications. 1,506 people (14.7%) earned over $70,000 compared to 17.2% nationally. The employment status of those at least 15 was that 4,440 (43.3%) people were employed full-time, 1,548 (15.1%) were part-time, and 258 (2.5%) were unemployed.

Wineries 

Taradale is a gateway to some of the finest and oldest wineries in New Zealand. The area is rich in wine heritage dating back as far as the 1850s. Two of the most famous vineyards in Hawkes Bay, Mission Estate Winery and Church Road Winery, together attract over 300,000 tourists annually.

Mission Estate Winery, founded in 1851 and occupying its present site in Church Road since 1897, is the oldest New Zealand winery still in operation and is a tourist attraction. French Marist missionaries established the Hawke's Bay Marist Mission at Pākōwhai in 1851. The mission was moved to Meeanee in 1858 and a vineyard was established to produce sacramental and table wines, and a church and school were built soon after. In 1880 a two-storied house was built as a seminary. Following the 1887 flood, an 800-acre (325 hectares) property in Church Road was purchased from Henry Tiffen and a new vineyard was established. Some of the original terracing can be seen on the hillside area now used for the Mission Concert held every February. In 1910 the Mount St. Mary Seminary building was moved from Meeanee to its present Mission location on Church Road. It was cut into eleven sections and rolled on logs towed by a traction engine, an operation that took two days. An accommodation block was built and opened in February 1931. The next day the Hawke's Bay earthquake struck, causing serious damage to the entire Mission. Two priests and seven students were killed when the stone chapel was destroyed. The seminary building was refurbished in the early 2000s to accommodate a restaurant and function rooms. The Mission is a popular venue for weddings.

The Church Road Winery, formerly McDonald's Wines, was founded in 1897 by Bartholemew Steinmetz, a lay brother from the Marist Mission, and is one of the oldest wineries in Hawke's Bay. Some of its most illustrious years were spent under the leadership of pioneer winemaker Tom McDonald, now widely acknowledged as the father of New Zealand's premium red wine industry. The winery buildings now include a restaurant, and a wine museum, housed underground, traces the history and techniques of winemaking.

With the rapid growth of the wine industry in Hawke's Bay the number of wineries in the Taradale area is increasing. Other wineries near the area include Brookfield's Vineyards, Dobel Estate situated on the banks of the Tutaekuri River, Moana Park Winery behind the Taradale hills and Tironui Estate nestled just below Sugarloaf hill.

Landmarks

War Memorial Clock Tower

The Taradale clock tower was built in 1923 as a Taradale and District World War 1 Memorial. The tower is situated where several roads converge and is a prominent landmark. Designed by John Ellis and built by Mr A. B. Davis, the hexagonal tower is 15 metres tall. The tower was unveiled in 1923 by Admiral Viscount Jellicoe, Governor General of New Zealand. Following the 1931 earthquake, the tower developed a lean of  but was able to be restored by John Ellis. In 1997 murals depicting the three armed services were painted by Brenda Morrell.

Ormlie Lodge

Ormlie Lodge was built by William Nelson in 1899 as a wedding present to his daughter Gertrude and son-in-law Hector Smith. The 1931 earthquake damaged the house extensively, forcing the Smiths to move out for two years while it was repaired at the cost of £1764 (GB pounds). Gertrude and Hector, who had four daughters, lived their entire married life on the estate. Gertrude died in 1955; Hector remained in the villa another seven years until he sold it in 1962, just before his death at the age of 93.

The new owners turned the home into a private hotel, and the stables were converted into one of Hawkes Bay's finest restaurants during the 1960s. For the next twenty years the gracious homestead went through a number of changes and owners. In 1985 fire destroyed the Stables Restaurant. The homestead itself was not touched by the blaze. The Stables Restaurant was never rebuilt. Soon after the fire, new owners bought the lodge, renovated it to its former glory, and engaged the services of the son of the original builder to construct the elegant ballroom, which is now the venue for weddings, conferences and other functions.

Facilities 
Taradale Library

When Taradale amalgamated with Napier in 1968, Taradale Library became a branch of Napier Library; the joint library service has been called "Napier Libraries" since a rebranding in 2008. Taradale Library was located in a building on Gloucester Street until 1995, when it moved to a new extension of the former Rugby Club Rooms on White Street. A 2007 study recommended that the Library building be extended to a total floor area of 1275 square metres. The current re-built and enlarged Taradale Library building opened on 13 July 2009. The upgrade of $1.7 million provided a light and spacious building that caters for the information, educational and recreational needs of all age groups. The new-look library makes the most of its setting in White Street, with comfortable seating and extensive windows that take advantage of views of Centennial and Taradale parks.

Pettigrew Green Arena

Pettigrew Green Arena is a large facility that can accommodate small or large sports games, concerts and fairs. It has a gym, squash / badminton facilities, yoga and ball training. It also has the Sports Hawkes Bay office, which helps with promoting sport to young people, organising games and competitions and has a service offered to young children to help them lead more healthy lives, as well as some programs for adults.

Tareha Recreational Reserve

Tareha Recreational Reserve is a sport and recreation ground at the southern end of Taradale, near the Tutaekuri River. The land was originally set aside as a Crown reserve in 1917, as part of a soil conservation and river control reserve for the river. The land was separated from the riverbed by the construction of the stopbank in 1970. Its ownership passed from the Hawke's Bay Catchment Board to the Hawke's Bay Regional Council, and during this period it was used as a nursery and for grazing stock. In 1992, Taradale Rugby Club approached the regional council looking to lease the area for playing fields. The negotiations that followed saw the transfer of the land to Napier City to be developed as a recreation reserve for the rapidly expanding urban area of Taradale-Greenmeadows.

The park's name commemorates Tareha Te Moananui, a Māori tribal leader and member of Parliament who lived nearby at Waiohiki.

Park Island

Park Island sports and recreation ground is to the north of Taradale, within 5 minutes drive, and adjacent to the suburb of Tamatea. It is heavily used for local, regional and national sporting events, in particular soccer, hockey, and rugby.

Parks and reserves 
Sugar Loaf

The 127-metre hill known as Sugar Loaf or Pukekura dominates the skyline of the western hills above Taradale and its distinctive shape can be seen from all over Taradale and parts of Napier. On the summit of the hill was once Pukekura Pā, an outpost pā of Ōtātara Pā and Hikurangi Pā, built and occupied at about the same time. Mr G. Halliwell bought the hill and surrounding land from Henry Tiffen in the 1980s. It has always been a focus for recreation in the area, probably due to the magnificent 360-degree views of Hawke's Bay from the summit. In the 1920s it was site of moonlight picnics particularly popular with younger people, and in the 1930s motorbike races were held in Taradale each Easter, with the hill-climb section taking the riders up the steep slopes of Sugar Loaf. The hill did not escape unscathed in the earthquake of 1931. Church Road Winery winemaker Tom McDonald recalled 'seeing the top of the hill rise up in the air and fall down again an estimated seven feet'. The Halliwell family gave the summit and surrounding area in the 1980s to be retained as a reserve.

Eastern views from the summit cover the Napier–Taradale area and much of the Heretaunga Plains, while western views include the Ruahine and Kaweka Ranges. The track to the summit is steep, especially from the Cumberland Rise entrance. The walk is graded moderate to difficult.

The Taradale Hills are split into 4 parts: The pine tree-covered hill of Mission Heights, the distinctive Sugarloaf, the reserve hill of Dolbel/Puketapu and the steep hill slope of Ōtātara.

Ōtātara Pā Historical Reserve

Located on a commanding hill site south of Taradale, Ōtātara Pā is among New Zealand's most important archaeological sites. Providing an insight into the area's Māori history, the original Ōtātara and Hikurangi pā sites are encompassed in the 33-hectare historical reserve formed in 1973. Ngāti Pārau of Waiohiki, kaitiaki (caretakers) of Ōtātara, have partnered with the Department of Conservation in developing and managing the reserve. Māori occupied the knoll as long ago as the late 15th century, and it was here that Ngāti Kahungunu gained a foothold in Heretaunga and spread to become the dominant iwi in Hawke's Bay and the Wairarapa. The remains of house terraces and food pits can be seen, and restoration work has included tree planting, palisades and pouwhenua, the carved posts symbolising the relationship between Māori iwi and hapu and the land.

Following the hilly track, walkers can appreciate the site's natural defensive qualities. Standing sentinel over the Heretaunga Plains to the south, both pā were protected from attack by cliffs, steep spurs and a steep drop to the Tutaekuri River.

Dolbel Reserve

Dolbel Reserve is named after brothers Philip and Richard Dolbel, who came from Jersey to New Zealand in 1855 and owned farmland that included the present reserve land. The reserve covers 18 hectares of flat land and hill terrain and a walk to the top gives extensive views over Hawke's Bay from Mahia to Cape Kidnappers. There are approximately 10 km of track, on the flat and climbing to the hilltop over open slopes and through gullies of native planting. In 1991 Taradale Rotary Club took on the project of creating a tree park on this council-owned reserve under the guidance of the former Napier Council Parks and Reserves Manager Don Bell. The vision of Rotary was to establish a memorial park of trees for the free use of the community, with people able to arrange to plant a tree to mark a family milestone.

Anderson Park

Anderson Park covers an area of 40 hectares and is situated on what was once a racecourse owned by Henry Tiffen. Napier Park Racing Club set up their headquarters here in 1886 and racing continued until 1961. Several saltwater creeks, used as hazards in the horse races, traversed the area and the line of these can still be traced in the contours of the park. The large pond was used as a "borrowing pond", the silt being dredged and spread on the straight each season to level and top-dress it. In 1931 the large open space was used as a field hospital for casualties of the earthquake. After the stand was demolished, the rubble was consolidated and grassed over, rather than being removed, now forming a low mound on the southern side of the park. A block of the original stables has been preserved on the western edge of the park, today used as Parks and Reserve Department storage. The land could have become a residential subdivision, but was acquired as a pleasure ground in 1962 by Napier City Council and has been developed into the fine open space it is today. On his death in 1963 Haskell Anderson, after whom the park was named and founder of a large local nursery, left a bequeath to Napier City Council to establish the JN Anderson Family Endowment Fund for tree planting.

Taradale Domain and Centennial Park

Taradale Park was opened in 1916 on land leased and later purchased by Taradale Town Board and over the years has become a valuable community amenity. The water wheel was erected by the Rotary Club in 1968. The wheel was originally built in 1920 and was used to generate electricity in a private home. Taradale Park is the home of the Taradale Sports Association, which includes Taradale Cricket Club, Napier Harriers Club, Greendale Tennis Club and Taradale Association Football Club. Taradale Public Library and associated parking are on a separate title subdivided off Centennial Park. The southern corner of the reserve provides a children's play area and a skateboard bowl. Taradale Kindergarten and Taradale Friendship Centre are also on the reserve. A passive recreation area, the western extension – Centennial Park – is treed and includes a rose garden and water features.

Education 

Taradale has several schools, with decile ratings between 7 and 10:

 Arthur Miller School, a state primary school with a roll of 
 Bledisloe School, a state primary school with a roll of 
 Reignier Catholic School, a state-integrated Catholic primary school with a roll of 
 Taradale School, a state primary school with a roll of 
 Taradale High School, a state secondary school with a roll of 
 Fairhaven special needs school

The expanding Eastern Institute of Technology (EIT) provides a broad range of diploma and degree qualifications.

References

External links 

 Taradale & District RSA
 Taradale Club
 Taradale Rotary Club
 Taradale war graves and war memorials

Populated places in the Hawke's Bay Region
Suburbs of Napier, New Zealand